Soe Min Oo (born 8 March 1988) is a Burmese footballer who plays for the Myanmar national football team  and Shan United of Myanmar National League.

As a secondary school student, Soe played in Student football competitions. In 2004, he went to Mandalay Institute of Sports and was chosen for Myanmar U-16 on the same year. He then played for Da Gun FC of Myanmar Premier League between 2004–2005 season. After Da Gun FC was dissolved in 2006, Soe Min Oo moved to YCDC FC. From 2007 onwards, he has been playing for the current club, Kanbawza where he remains until now. In 2009 when Myanmar went into professional football to replace out-of-favour MPL, Soe remains with Kanbawza despite many interests from clubs around the country. Soe Min Oo was the top scorer in 2009 AFC President's Cup. On 3 April 2016, he scores his 100th goal in Myanmar National League to become the first local player and second overall (after César Augusto) to reach this statistic.

International goals

Honours

Shan United
Myanmar National League:  2017

Individual
 Myanmar National League all-time top scorer

References

External links

1988 births
Living people
Burmese footballers
Myanmar international footballers
People from Mandalay Region
Kanbawza F.C. players
Association football forwards